The 2021–22 Russian Football National League 2 is the third highest division in Russian football. The Russian Football National League 2 is geographically divided into 4 groups.
The winners of each zone are automatically promoted into the National Football League. The bottom finishers of each zone lose professional status and are relegated into the Amateur Football League.

Group 1 (South)

Standings

Group 2 (West)

Group A

Standings

Group B

Standings

Promotion Group

Standings

Relegation Group

Standings

Group 3 (Center)

Group A

Standings

Group B

Standings

Promotion Group

Standings

Relegation Group

Standings

Group 4 (East)

Standings

References

2021-22
3
Rus